Tabarana Kathe (Tabara's Tale) is a 1987 Indian Kannada-language film released directed by Girish Kasaravalli. It was based on a short story of the same name by Poornachandra Tejaswi. Film historian S. Theodore Baskaran picked Tabarana Kathe in Rediff.com's ten best Indian films of all time.

Plot 

Tabarana Kathe is the story of Tabara Shetty, a government servant in the ranks of a watchman. He serves the government till his retirement. He is a dedicated worker and respects the system that sustained him for so long. But problems emerge after his retirement.

Tabara never gets his pension money. In his failing old age, Tabara approaches the officials he had served. Except for a few sympathisers, nobody helps Tabara get his pension. Matters worsen when his wife and only companion falls sick with diabetes. She has a sore foot which turns to gangrene. Tabara tries all means to get his pension to treat his wife. After a few months, his wife dies. The pension money arrives after that. Tabara curses his higher officials and the system which ruined his life.

Cast 
 Charuhasan as Tabara Shetty
 Nalina Murty
 Santosh Nandavanam
 Hasakru

Production
The film was shot in Mudigere in Chickmagalur district of Karnataka.

Awards and screenings
Tabarana Kathe was screened at film festivals including Tashkent, Nantes, Tokyo and the Film Festival of Russia.

34th National Film Awards

 Best Feature Film - Tabarana Kathe
 Best Actor — Charuhasan

Karnataka State Film Awards 1986-87

 First Best Film
 Best Director — Girish Kasaravalli
 Best Story — Poornachandra Tejaswi
 Best Dialogue — Poornachandra Tejaswi
 Best Actor — Charuhasan
 Best Editing — M. N. Swamy
 Best Child Actor — Santosh Nandavanam

References

External links
 
 Rediff.com's Ten Best Indian Films of all time

1987 films
1980s Kannada-language films
Films featuring a Best Actor National Award-winning performance
Best Feature Film National Film Award winners
Kannada literature
Films directed by Girish Kasaravalli